Francesco Mallardo (born April 1, 1951, in Giugliano in Campania), also known as Ciccio 'e Carlantonio, is an Italian criminal and a member of the Neapolitan Camorra. He headed the Mallardo clan operating from the town of Giugliano in Campania, north of the city of Naples. He was added to the list of thirty most dangerous fugitives in Italy.

Biography 
Francesco and his younger brother Giuseppe Mallardo succeeded their father Domenico Mallardo, who was killed by the Maisto clan on June 24, 1976. The murder led to a vendetta that lasted until April 1987 with the killing of Antonio Maisto and two others. This wiped out the Maisto clan crime scene in Giugliano, now dominated by the Mallardos. The attack also marked the final break of relations between the Mallardos and the Nuvoletta clan from Marano. To complete the triple murder, the Mallardo clan allied themselves with the Casalesi clan of Francesco Schiavone and Francesco Bidognetti who demanded a farewell to the historic alliance between Giugliano and Marano, who had been allied in the Nuova Famiglia that aimed to put an end to the excessive power of Raffaele Cutolo's Nuova Camorra Organizzata (NCO) in the late 1970s and 1980s.

The subsequent rise of Mallardo in both power and prominence is linked to the Licciardi and Contini clans. The three clans together formed a coalition called the Secondigliano Alliance, in order to gain a stranglehold in the drug trafficking and extortion rackets in Naples.

Arrest 
On April 14, 2000, he was arrested in a country house between Qualiano and Giugliano while attending a meeting of the so-called Secondigliano Alliance. Among the 13 people arrested were Patrizio Bosti and Feliciano Mallardo. They tried to escape, but were blocked by the police.

The boss has a heart condition and suffered a heart attack in the maximum security prison in Parma. He escaped from custody from two hospitals, one in his hometown Giugliano, and from a clinic in Pinerolo, near Turin. He was arrested again on August 29, 2003. The police, who had been on his trail, discovered the car of Mallardo on the A30 near Nola and set up a road block. Mallardo, who returned from a vacation with his family, pretended to stop but then suddenly accelerated, slightly injuring two policemen. Police then fired a few shots and hit a car tire. After a few hundred meters the car came to a standstill.

References

1951 births
Camorristi
Fugitives
Fugitives wanted by Italy
Living people
People from Giugliano in Campania
Secondigliano Alliance